Vladimír Miko (22 March 1943 - 30 December 2017), was a male former international table tennis player from Slovakia.

Table tennis career
He won a bronze medal at the 1967 World Table Tennis Championships with Jaroslav Staněk.

He started playing in 1951 and was coached by Ladislav Štípek and Ludvík Vyhnanovský. He played in five European Championships, reached a world ranking of 9 and retired in 1970.

He also won five English Open titles.

Coaching
He was the national coach of Luxembourg from 1971 to 1973, and then the national coach for Czechoslovakia until 1990.

See also
 List of table tennis players
 List of World Table Tennis Championships medalists

References

Slovak male table tennis players
1943 births
2017 deaths
World Table Tennis Championships medalists
Czechoslovak table tennis players
Sportspeople from Krupina